Jackveer Singh Brar (born 18 November 1996) is an English professional golfer who plays on the European Tour. He won the 2018 Cordon Golf Open. As an amateur, he represented Great Britain and Ireland in the 2017 Walker Cup.

Amateur career
Singh Brar had a successful amateur career, culminating in the 2017 Walker Cup. Although Great Britain and Ireland lost heavily, he won three of his four matches, winning two foursomes matches played with Scott Gregory and the first of his two singles matches.

Professional career
Singh Brar turned professional after the 2017 Walker Cup. He qualified for the 2018 Alps Tour and in February won the Red Sea Little Venice Open in Egypt on his second start, winning by 5 strokes from Bernard Neumayer. In April he made his debut on the Challenge Tour, in the Turkish Airlines Challenge, and was joint runner-up behind Joachim B. Hansen. He had two fourth place finishes on the Challenge Tour before winning the Cordon Golf Open in September, by three strokes from Adri Arnaus. He finished 6th in the Order of Merit to earn a place on the 2019 European Tour.

Amateur wins
2012 Faldo Series - Grand Final
2013 South England Boys Open
2017 Hampshire Salver, Lytham Trophy

Source:

Professional wins (2)

Challenge Tour wins (1)

Alps Tour wins (1)

Team appearances
Amateur
European Boys' Team Championship (representing England): 2013, 2014
Walker Cup (representing Great Britain & Ireland): 2017

See also
2018 Challenge Tour graduates

References

External links
 
 
 
 

English male golfers
Sportspeople from Southampton
1996 births
Living people